Sun Hill is an unincorporated community in Wyoming County, West Virginia, United States. Sun Hill is located on the Clear Fork and County Route 6.  southwest of Oceana.

References

Unincorporated communities in Wyoming County, West Virginia
Unincorporated communities in West Virginia